Muzamir Mutyaba (born 10 October 1993) is an Ugandan international footballer who plays for Express, as a midfielder.

Career
He has played club football for Maroons, Victoria University and Kampala Capital City Authority. After leaving KCCA at the end of the 2019–20 season, in January 2021 he signed for Express.

He made his international debut for Uganda in 2014.

International goals
Scores and results Uganda's goal tally first.

References

1993 births
Living people
Ugandan footballers
Uganda international footballers
Maroons FC players
SC Victoria University players
Kampala Capital City Authority FC players
Express FC players
Association football midfielders
Uganda A' international footballers
2016 African Nations Championship players
2018 African Nations Championship players